Novofedorovka is a rural locality (a village) in Ibrayevsky Selsoviet, Aurgazinsky District, Bashkortostan, Russia. The population was 799 as of 2010. There are 11 streets.

Geography 
Novofedorovka is located 24 km northeast of Tolbazy (the district's administrative centre) by road. Dubrovka is the nearest rural locality.

References 

Rural localities in Aurgazinsky District